Evelyn Lee Stevens (born May 9, 1983) is an American retired professional road cyclist.

Early life
Stevens was born in Claremont, California but grew up in Acton, Massachusetts, where she attended Acton-Boxborough Regional High School. She studied government and women and gender studies at Dartmouth College in New Hampshire and was a member of the college's tennis team.

After graduating in 2005 she moved to New York City where she worked for Lehman Brothers for two years, then for mezzanine fund Gleacher Mezzanine before quitting  in July 2009 to take up cycling full-time.

Career
She competed at the 2012 Summer Olympics in the women's road race, finishing 24th. In July 2014, Stevens competed at the Giro d'Italia and Thüringen Rundfahrt over 17 consecutive days of racing, finishing 14th and 1st respectively.

On February 27, 2016, Stevens rode the current UCI Hour record for women at the Olympic Training Center Velodrome in Colorado, United States with a distance of 47.980 km. She broke the record set January 22 by Australian Bridie O'Donnell in Adelaide, Australia by 1.1 km. Stevens was one of only three women (along with Trixi Worrack and Ellen van Dijk) to win four gold medals in the women's team time trial at the UCI Road World Championships.

Major results

Source:

2008
 1st Green Mountain Stage Race Cat 3/4 Women
2009
 1st Overall Tour of the Battenkill
 1st Overall Jiminy Peak
 1st Overall Bear Mountain
 1st Overall Housatonic Hills
 1st Overall Fitchburg Longsjo Classic
 1st Overall Cascade Cycling Classic
 2nd Time trial, National Road Championships
 2nd Overall La Route de France
1st Stage 5
2010
 1st  Time trial, National Road Championships
 1st Chrono Gatineau
 1st Stage 7 Giro d'Italia Femminile
 1st Stage 6 North Star Grand Prix
 5th Overall Redlands Bicycle Classic
1st Stage 3
 5th La Flèche Wallonne Féminine
 5th GP de Plouay – Bretagne
 6th Time trial, UCI Road World Championships
 6th Sparkassen Giro
 9th Overall Giro della Toscana Int. Femminile – Memorial Michela Fanini
2011
 1st  Time trial, National Road Championships
 1st Stage 2 (TTT) Trophée d'Or Féminin
 1st Stage 5 Tour Cycliste Féminin International de l'Ardèche
 2nd  Time trial, Pan American Road Championships
 2nd GP de Plouay – Bretagne
 7th Grand Prix Elsy Jacobs
 9th Memorial Davide Fardelli
 9th Chrono Champenois
2012
 UCI Road World Championships
1st  Team time trial (with Ellen van Dijk, Charlotte Becker, Amber Neben, Ina-Yoko Teutenberg and Trixi Worrack)
2nd  Time trial
 1st  Overall Women's Tour of New Zealand
 1st  Overall Gracia-Orlová
1st Points classification
1st Stage 1
 1st  Overall Exergy Tour
 1st  Overall La Route de France
1st Stages 7 & 9
 1st La Flèche Wallonne Féminine
 Open de Suède Vårgårda
1st Team time trial
9th Road race
 1st Stage 4b (TTT) Energiewacht Tour
 2nd Time trial, National Road Championships
 2nd Overall Holland Ladies Tour
1st Stage 2 (TTT)
 2nd Chrono Gatineau
 3rd Overall Giro d'Italia Femminile
1st Stage 3
 5th GP de Plouay – Bretagne
 10th Grand Prix Cycliste de Gatineau
2013
 UCI Road World Championships
1st  Team time trial (with Ellen van Dijk, Carmen Small, Katie Colclough, Lisa Brennauer and Trixi Worrack)
4th Time trial
5th Road race
 1st  Overall Giro del Trentino Alto Adige-Südtirol
1st  Points classification
1st Stage 1b
 1st Philadelphia Cycling Classic
 1st Amgen Tour of California Women's Time Trial
 1st Merco Cycling Classic
 Open de Suède Vårgårda
1st Team time trial
6th Road race
 1st Stage 1 (TTT) Belgium Tour
 1st Stage 2 (TTT) Holland Ladies Tour
 2nd Overall Gracia-Orlová
1st Stage 1
 3rd Overall Emakumeen Euskal Bira
 3rd Overall La Route de France
 3rd Durango-Durango Emakumeen Saria
 5th Overall Giro d'Italia Femminile
2014
 UCI Road World Championships
1st  Team time trial (with Carmen Small, Lisa Brennauer, Chantal Blaak, Karol-Ann Canuel, and Trixi Worrack)
3rd  Time trial
 1st  Time trial, Pan American Road Championships
 1st  Overall Thüringen Rundfahrt der Frauen
1st Stage 4
 Active rider award, Stage 2
 1st  Overall Holland Ladies Tour
 1st Philadelphia Cycling Classic
 1st Open de Suède Vårgårda TTT
 National Road Championships
3rd Road race
3rd Time trial
 4th La Flèche Wallonne Féminine
 10th Tour of Flanders for Women
2015
 1st Amgen Tour of California Women's Time Trial
 1st  Mountains classification Ladies Tour of Norway
 UCI Road World Championships
2nd  Team time trial
6th Time trial
 3rd Overall Women's Tour of New Zealand
1st Stage 1 (TTT)
 3rd Crescent Women World Cup Vårgårda TTT
 4th Durango-Durango Emakumeen Saria
 6th La Flèche Wallonne Féminine
 6th Philadelphia Cycling Classic
 7th Time trial, EPZ Omloop van Borsele
 8th GP de Plouay
 9th Overall Giro d'Italia Femminile
 10th Overall Emakumeen Euskal Bira
2016
 Hour record: 47.980 km
 1st  Team time trial, UCI Road World Championships
 1st Crescent Vårgårda UCI Women's WorldTour TTT
 2nd Overall Giro d'Italia Femminile
1st Stages 2, 6 & 7 (ITT)
 2nd La Flèche Wallonne Féminine
 3rd Overall Tour of California
 4th Philadelphia Cycling Classic
 8th Overall Emakumeen Euskal Bira
 10th Time trial, Summer Olympics

References

External links
Profile at 

1983 births
Living people
American female cyclists
Cyclists at the 2012 Summer Olympics
Cyclists at the 2016 Summer Olympics
Olympic cyclists of the United States
Sportspeople from New York City
People from Acton, Massachusetts
Sportspeople from Middlesex County, Massachusetts
UCI Road World Champions (women)
21st-century American women
Cyclists from Massachusetts